Edward Powys Mathers (28 August 1892 – 3 February 1939) was an English translator and poet, and also a pioneer of compiling advanced cryptic crosswords. Powys Mathers was born in Forest Hill, London, the son of Edward Peter Mathers, newspaper proprietor. He was educated at Loretto School and Trinity College, Oxford.

He translated J. C. Mardrus's French version of One Thousand Nights and One Night. His English version of Mardrus appeared in 1923, and is known as Mardrus/Mathers. He also translated The Garden of Bright Waters: One Hundred and Twenty Asiatic Love Poems (1920); and the Kashmiri poet Bilhana in Bilhana: Black Marigolds (1919), a free interpretation in the tradition of Edward FitzGerald, quoted at length in John Steinbeck’s novel Cannery Row. These are not scholarly works, and are in some cases based on intermediate versions in European languages. Some of his translations were set to music by Aaron Copland.

He was also a composer of cryptic crosswords for The Observer under the pseudonym "Torquemada" from 1926 until his death. He was the author of Crosswords for Riper Years (1925) and The Torquemada Puzzle Book (1934), which included the murder mystery puzzle Cain's Jawbone. Under this pseudonym, he reviewed detective stories from 1934 to 1939.

In 1919 he married Rosamond Crowdy (5 July 1886 – 7 June 1965), third daughter of Colonel H. Crowdy, RE.

He died in his sleep at his home in Hampstead.

References

External links
 
 
 
 
 Black Marigolds at sacred-texts.com
 The Garden of Bright Waters

1892 births
1939 deaths
Crossword compilers
Translators of One Thousand and One Nights
Place of death missing
People educated at Loretto School, Musselburgh
English male poets
20th-century English poets
20th-century translators
20th-century English male writers